A Carnegie Library is a library built with money donated by Scottish-American businessman and philanthropist Andrew Carnegie.

Carnegie Library, Carnegie Public Library, Carnegie Free Library, Carnegie Free Public Library, Andrew Carnegie Library, Andrew Carnegie Free Library or Carnegie Library Building may also refer to:

England
 Carnegie Library, Herne Hill
 Carnegie Library, Runcorn
 Carnegie Library, Teddington

United States

Arizona
Phoenix Carnegie Library and Library Park
Carnegie Library (Prescott, Arizona)

California 
Carnegie Library (Anaheim, California))
Carnegie Library (Upland, California)
Andrew Carnegie Library (Corona, California)
Colton Carnegie Library
Dixon Carnegie Library, listed on the National Register of Historic Places (NRHP) in Solano County
Carnegie Free Library (Eureka, California)
Carnegie Art Museum (Oxnard, California)
Carnegie Free Library (Petaluma, California)
Livermore Carnegie Library and Park

Colorado 
 Carnegie Library (Boulder, Colorado)
 Carnegie Library (Monte Vista, Colorado)
 Carnegie Public Library (Rocky Ford, Colorado)
 Carnegie Public Library (Trinidad, Colorado), NRHP-listed in Las Animas County

District of Columbia 
 Carnegie Library of Washington D.C.

Florida 
 Bradenton Carnegie Library
 Mirror Lake Library or Carnegie Library
 Carnegie Library at FAMU

Georgia 
 Carnegie Library Building (Athens, Georgia)
 Carnegie Library (Dublin, Georgia)

Idaho 
 Carnegie Public Library (Boise, Idaho)

Indiana 
 Carnegie Center for Art & History, New Albany, originally opened as a Carnegie Library
 Carnegie Library of Covington
 Carnegie Public Library (Anderson, Indiana)
 Colfax Carnegie Library
 Greensburg Carnegie Public Library
 Carnegie Library (Muncie, Indiana)
 Rensselaer Carnegie Library

Iowa 
 Carnegie Library Building (Carroll, Iowa)
 Clarinda Carnegie Library
 Perry Carnegie Library Building
 Carnegie Library (Sheldon, Iowa)

Kansas 
 Carnegie Library (Newton, Kansas)
 Carnegie Library (Parsons, Kansas)
 Carnegie Library (Peabody, Kansas)
 Carnegie Library Building (Manhattan, Kansas)
 Carnegie Library Building (Washburn University), Topeka, Kansas
 Carnegie Library Building (Wichita, Kansas)

Kentucky 
 Carnegie Library (Corbin, Kentucky)
 Carnegie Library (Danville, Kentucky)
 Carnegie Library (Hickman, Kentucky)
 Carnegie Library (Lexington, Kentucky), part of the Gratz Park Historic District
 Carnegie Public Library (Shelbyville, Kentucky)

Michigan 
 Carnegie Public Library (Escanaba, Michigan)
 Ironwood Carnegie Library

Minnesota 
 Carnegie Public Library (Crookston, Minnesota), NRHP-listed in Polk County
 Redwood Falls Carnegie Library (Redwood Falls, Minnesota), NRHP-listed in Redwood County
 Bemdiji Carnegie Library

Montana 
 Carnegie Public Library (Big Timber, Montana)
 Carnegie Public Library (Havre, Montana)
 Carnegie Public Library (Missoula, Montana), NRHP-listed in Missoula County

Nebraska 
 Carnegie Public Library (Gothenburg, Nebraska)

New Jersey 
 Carnegie Library (Montclair, New Jersey)

New Mexico 
 Carnegie Library (Roswell, New Mexico)

New York 
 Niagara Falls Public Library or Carnegie Library
 Carnegie Library (North Tonawanda, New York)

Ohio 
 Carnegie Public Library (East Liverpool, Ohio)
 Carnegie Library (Sandusky, Ohio)

Oklahoma 
 Carnegie Library (El Reno, Oklahoma)
 Carnegie Library (Guthrie, Oklahoma)
 Carnegie Library (Lawton, Oklahoma)

Pennsylvania 
 Andrew Carnegie Free Library & Music Hall (Carnegie, Pennsylvania)
 Carnegie Free Library (Connellsville, Pennsylvania)
 Carnegie Library of Homestead, in Munhall
 Carnegie Free Library (McKeesport, Pennsylvania)
 Carnegie Library of Pittsburgh

South Carolina 
 Carnegie Free Library (Gaffney, South Carolina)
 Carnegie Public Library (Sumter, South Carolina)

South Dakota 
 Carnegie Public Library (Brookings, South Dakota), NRHP-listed in Brookings County
 Dallas Carnegie Library
 Carnegie Public Library (Dell Rapids, South Dakota), NRHP-listed in Minnehaha County
 Milbank Carnegie Library, NRHP-listed in Grant County
 Redfield Carnegie Library
 Carnegie Free Public Library (Sioux Falls, South Dakota)
 Carnegie Free Public Library (Watertown, South Dakota)

Tennessee 
 Carnegie Library (Nashville, Tennessee)

Texas 
 Carnegie Public Library (Belton, Texas), NRHP-listed in Bell County
 Carnegie Public Library (Tyler, Texas)

Washington 
 Andrew Carnegie Library (Edmonds, Washington)
 Carnegie Library (Hoquiam, Washington)

West Virginia 
 Carnegie Library (Parkersburg, West Virginia)
 Carnegie Public Library (Huntington, West Virginia)

Wisconsin 
 Carnegie Free Library (Sturgeon Bay, Wisconsin)

Wyoming 
 Carnegie Public Library (Buffalo, Wyoming)

See also
Andrew Carnegie
Carnegie Foundation
:Category:Carnegie libraries